The 1979 UCI Track Cycling World Championships were the World Championship for track cycling. They took place in Amsterdam, Netherlands in 1979. Twelve events were contested, 10 for men (3 for professionals, 7 for amateurs) and 2 for women.

Medal summary

Medal table

See also
 1979 UCI Road World Championships

References

Uci Track Cycling World Championships, 1979
Track cycling
UCI Track Cycling World Championships by year
International cycle races hosted by the Netherlands